Brandon Hunter King (born April 10, 2007), known professionally as YNW BSlime, is an American rapper and singer-songwriter. He is the younger brother of American rapper YNW Melly.

Early life 
Brandon Hunter King was born on April 10, 2007 in Gifford, Florida.

Career 
YNW BSlime first started making music in early-mid 2018, being featured on several songs with Melly, YNW Sakchaser and YNW Juvy; he recalls freestyling during the school lunch in the 7th grade. During middle school vacation, his brother YNW Melly threatened to stop paying for YNW BSlime's V-Bucks in the game Fortnite if he didn't come to a recording studio with him which pushed him to start recording.

In May 2019, during the 2019 Rolling Loud Miami Festival, American rapper Yung Bans invited YNW BSlime to perform his brother YNW Melly's song "Murder on My Mind". In July 2019, YNW BSlime released his first single titled "Hot Sauce" produced by DJ Chose.

In November 2019, he released his album Baby Goat with appearances from American rappers Lil Tjay and YNW Melly. In November 2020, he released his single "Nightmares" with American rapper Trippie Redd along with an accompanying music video.

In February 2021, he released his singles "Valenslime" and "OTW". In October 2021, he released his single "Citi Trends" with American rapper NLE Choppa. 

In January 2022, he appeared on American singer and rapper Kidd G's single "Left Me", which is noted as a crossover between rap music and country music. He also collabs with YBT Anubis (upcoming rapper on Soundcloud) and they record a song together. 

In October 2022, he released his single "Free Melly" with an appearance from American rapper DC the Don.

Musical style 
In a mixed review by Alphonse Pierre of Pitchfork YNW BSlime's musical style on his debut album Baby Goat is described in the following manner: "As a singer, YNW BSlime’s vocals were similar; you could tell he grew up on Young Thug like his brother. But instead of Melly’s rough edge, BSlime’s raps are brighter, like he sings hopped up on Honey Buns and dollar cans of Arizona iced tea." Steve Juon, writing for Rap Reviews also notes his style's similarity to Juice WRLD and Future. In an interview with RapTV, he calls Travis Scott, XXXTentacion, and older brother YNW Melly his biggest influences.

Discography

Studio albums

As lead artist

As featured artist

References

External links 
 

2007 births
Living people
21st-century American rappers
African-American male rappers
African-American male singer-songwriters
American contemporary R&B singers
Rappers from Florida
Singer-songwriters from Florida
Trap musicians